Izaiah Antoine Brockington (born July 12, 1999) is an American professional basketball player who currently plays for Birmingham Squadron of the NBA G League. He played college basketball for the St. Bonaventure Bonnies, Penn State Nittany Lions, and Iowa State Cyclones.

High school career
Brockington played basketball for Archbishop Ryan High School in Philadelphia, Pennsylvania. He entered the starting lineup as a sophomore. In his senior season, Brockington averaged 18.6 points per game and led his team to its first Class 6A semifinals appearance. He finished his high school career with 1,242 career points, becoming the third 1,000-point scorer in program history. Brockington originally committed to playing college basketball for NJIT in August 2016, before announcing he would do a prep year at Woodstock Academy in Woodstock, Connecticut. In August 2017, he instead signed with St. Bonaventure.

College career
As a freshman at St. Bonaventure, Brockington averaged 4.3 points and 1.2 rebounds per game. He transferred to Penn State for his sophomore season. Brockington sat out for one season due to NCAA transfer rules. He assumed a sixth man role as a sophomore, averaging 8.1 points and 2.7 rebounds per game. In his junior year, Brockington became a regular starter, and averaged 12.6 points, 4.9 rebounds and 1.7 assists per game. He scored a season-high 24 points against Virginia Tech and had 18 double-figure scoring performances. For his senior season, Brockington transferred to Iowa State. He entered the 2021 NBA draft before withdrawing his name. On November 24, 2021, Brockington scored 30 points in an 82–70 win against Xavier. He scored a career-high 35 points in an 84–81 win against West Virginia on February 23, 2022. For the season, Brockington averaged 16.9 points, 6.8 rebounds, and 1.6 assists per game. He was named to the First Team All-Big 12 as well as Big 12 Newcomer of the Year. On March 28, 2022, Brockington announced he would forego his additional year of eligibility and declare for the 2022 NBA draft.

Professional career

Birmingham Squadron (2023–present)
Brockington went undrafted in the 2022 NBA draft. On September 12, 2022, Brockington signed a two-way contract with the New Orleans Pelicans and the Birmingham Squadron. He was then later waived on September 24, 2022. On March 14, 2023, the Birmingham Squadron announced that they had acquired Brockington.

Career statistics

College

|-
| style="text-align:left;"| 2017–18
| style="text-align:left;"| St. Bonaventure
| 34 || 1 || 11.6 || .441 || .415 || .538 || 1.2 || .9 || .4 || .1 || 4.3
|-
| style="text-align:left;"| 2018–19
| style="text-align:left;"| Penn State
| style="text-align:center;" colspan="11"|  Redshirt
|-
| style="text-align:left;"| 2019–20
| style="text-align:left;"| Penn State
| 31 || 0 || 20.8 || .445 || .267 || .703 || 2.7 || 1.1 || .8 || .1 || 8.1
|-
| style="text-align:left;"| 2020–21
| style="text-align:left;"| Penn State
| 25 || 24 || 29.7 || .430 || .279 || .841 || 4.9 || 1.7 || 1.0 || .2 || 12.6
|-
| style="text-align:left;"| 2021–22
| style="text-align:left;"| Iowa State
| 35 || 35 || 34.6 || .447 || .362 || .775 || 6.8 || 1.6 || 1.3 || .3 || 16.9
|- class="sortbottom"
| style="text-align:center;" colspan="2"| Career
| 125 || 60 || 23.9 || .442 || .340 || .748 || 3.9 || 1.3 || .9 || .2 || 10.4

Personal life
Brockington is the son of Jennifer St. Jean and Antoine Brockington. Brockington's father, Antoine, was named Mid-Eastern Athletic Conference Player of the Year for 1997–98 during his college basketball career at Coppin State, before playing professionally overseas. Antoine scored 1,448 career points, including 20 points in a three-point overtime loss to the Cyclones at Hilton Coliseum in 1997. During high school, Izaiah played AAU for Team Philly and WeR1. Izaiah earned an undergraduate degree from Penn State in labor and employment relations and worked toward a master’s degree in family financial planning at Iowa State University.

Brockington's mother, Jennifer, was a member of the Philadelphia Eagles Cheerleaders during the 2005-2006 season. His step-father, Noisette St. Jean Jr., is a writer, director, and producer.

References

External links
Iowa State Cyclones bio
Penn State Nittany Lions bio
St. Bonaventure Bonnies bio

1999 births
Living people
American men's basketball players
Basketball players from Philadelphia
St. Bonaventure Bonnies men's basketball players
Penn State Nittany Lions basketball players
Iowa State Cyclones men's basketball players
Shooting guards